Terracina Calcio 1925 is an Italian football club based in Terracina, Lazio.  it plays in Italy's Serie D.

History

Foundation 
The club was founded in 1925.

Serie D 
In the season 2012–13 the team was promoted from Eccellenza Lazio/B to Serie D after nine years of absence.

Colors and badge 
The team's colors are lightblue and white.

References

External links
Official website 

Football clubs in Italy
Football clubs in Lazio
Terracina
Association football clubs established in 1925
1925 establishments in Italy